Maria Arkhipova (born 9 January 1983), known by her stage name as Masha Scream, is a Russian metal musician from Moscow. She is the founder, vocalist and main songwriter of the folk metal band Arkona. She has also played in other bands such as Nargathrond.

Personal life 
Arkhipova is married to fellow band member Sergei "Lazar" Atrashkevich with whom she has two children.

Discography

With Arkona

Studio albums 
 Vozrozhdeniye (2004)
 Lepta (2004)
 Vo Slavu Velikim! (2005)
 Ot Serdtsa K Nebu (2007)
 Goi, Rode, Goi! (2009)
 Stenka Na Stenku (2011, EP)
 Slovo (2011)
 Yav (2014)
 Khram (2018)

Live albums / DVDs 
 Zhizn Vo Slavu (2006)
 Noch Velesova (2009)

With Nargathrond

Studio albums 
 Carnal Lust and Wolfen Hunger (2000)
 ...For We Blessed This World With Plagues (2002)
 Inevitability (2004)

Guest appearances 
Arkhipova appeared as a guest vocalist on Svarga's first two albums Ogni na Kurganah and There, Where Woods Doze.... She also appeared on Ancestral Volkhves' second studio album Perun Do Vas!!! and on Percival (band) "Wodnik" from album Svantevit.

References

External links

1983 births
Russian modern pagans
Russian heavy metal singers
Women heavy metal singers
Singers from Moscow
Living people
Performers of modern pagan music
21st-century Russian singers
21st-century Russian women singers
Women in metal